Idan Shemesh (born 6 August 1990) is an Israeli professional footballer who plays for Israeli National League side Hapoel Petah Tikva.

Club career

Early years
Shemesh started his football career with the youth teams of Hapoel Rishon LeZion and Maccabi Tel Aviv. On summer 2009 he loan to Hapoel Marmorek.

Maccabi Petah Tikva

On 7 July 2014 Shemesh signed with Maccabi Petah Tikva and he scored the first goal in the Israeli Premier League on 10 January 2015.

Bnei Sakhnin

On 4 September 2016 Shemesh signed with Bnei Sakhnin. He scored 6 goals on 2016–17 and 3 goals on 2017–18.

Hapoel Haifa

On 24 January 2019 Shemesh signed with Hapoel Haifa. Two days after, he scored the first goal in the team.

References

1990 births
Living people
Israeli footballers
Hapoel Marmorek F.C. players
Hapoel Katamon Jerusalem F.C. players
Maccabi Petah Tikva F.C. players
Bnei Sakhnin F.C. players
Sektzia Ness Ziona F.C. players
Hapoel Haifa F.C. players
Hapoel Ra'anana A.F.C. players
Hapoel Jerusalem F.C. players
Hapoel Umm al-Fahm F.C. players
Hapoel Petah Tikva F.C. players
Liga Leumit players
Israeli Premier League players
Footballers from Rishon LeZion
Association football forwards
Israeli people of Iraqi-Jewish descent